Aenictus aratus is a species of beige and dark brown army ant found in Northern Australia. Parasitic depredation has been observed from Phoridae flies.

References

Dorylinae
Hymenoptera of Australia
Insects described in 1900